"Jet Airliner" is a song composed by Paul Pena in 1973 and popularized by the Steve Miller Band in 1977.

Pena wrote and recorded "Jet Airliner" in 1973 for his New Train album. However, New Train was not released until 2000, due to conflicts between him and his label.

Steve Miller heard Pena's unreleased New Train album through Ben Sidran, who produced it, and who was formerly in Miller's band. Miller recorded "Jet Airliner"  in 1975 during sessions for the Fly Like an Eagle album, but the song was not issued until 1977, when it was released as a single and was included on Miller's Book of Dreams album. The lyrics of the Steve Miller Band version are slightly different from the Pena original. Miller's performance of the main riff also is slightly different from Pena's original, which has a more funky edge to it. The song is also notable for helping to popularize the phrase "keep on keepin' on", previously found in John Lennon's song "Old Dirt Road" (1974) and Bob Dylan's songs "You Ain't Goin' Nowhere" (1971) and "Tangled Up in Blue" (1975). The single reached  on the Billboard chart.

On classic rock radio, Miller's "Jet Airliner" is generally played in tandem with "Threshold", the all-synthesizer instrumental that precedes it on Book of Dreams and the Greatest Hits 1974–78 compilation.

Single edit
The single edit of Miller's recording features a truncated version of the guitar intro. In addition, one line of the song's lyrics was altered for radio play; instead of "that I don't want to get caught up in any of that funky shit goin' down in the city", it was changed to "funky kicks". The single edit was included on the original release of Greatest Hits 1974–78, although the full album version has been used for later CD reissues of the compilation.

The single edit also had a slightly different mix of Miller's lead vocal. On the album version, one can often hear Miller breathing into the microphone as he begins singing a line. His breathing was mixed out of the single release.

Cash Box said that it "has the best of Miller's past and present, including impeccable harmonies and a deep guitar arrangement that pumps along steadily."

Chart performance

Weekly charts

Year-end charts

References

External links
 

1973 songs
1977 singles
Capitol Records singles
Steve Miller Band songs
Song recordings produced by Steve Miller